PJSC "Bank Otkrytie Financial Corporation" or Otkrytie FC Bank (translates as opening or discovery) is one of Russia's largest  full-service commercial banks. It has more than 440 offices of different formats in Russia. It was co-founded by Igor Finogenov, now CEO of the Eurasian Development Bank.

Otkrytie Bank ranked 1st among privately owned banks and 4th by assets among banking groups in Russia. In August 2017, Otkrytie was bailed out by the Central Bank of Russia, at a cost to the state of over $8 billion. The central bank later described Otkrytie's capital as "largely fictitious".

History

The lending institution was registered as TIPCO Venture Bank  in 1992. The bank was renamed in 1994 as joint stock investment commercial bank Novaya Moskva (Russian for New Moscow), and Nomos-Bank  in 2007. ICT Group (Alexander Nesis is a co-owner) gathered a controlling stake in the bank in May 2006.

Otkrytie Holding 
In 2012 Otkrytie took over NOMOS-Bank, using a $1bn loan from VTB Bank.

In 2014 NOMOS-Bank was renamed to Otkrytie Financial Corporation Bank.

In 2014 the Bank of Russia picked Bank FC Otkritie to rescue National Bank Trust.

Otkritie allegedly became Russia's largest private bank in late 2014 by buying 625 billion rubles in bonds from the state oil company Rosneft, using them as collateral to obtain reverse repo loans from the Central Bank of Russia, then passing on the dollars it received to Rosneft, which is not allowed access to international capital markets due to western sanctions. As repo funding had a 2.5% interest rate and the bond had a 7.5% coupon, Otkritie made billions from the trade.

In 2015, all in all, Otkritie Holding's banks lay claims to get a big share of government aid among all private banks (Rub 65.2 bln or 7.8% of the government program).

Acquisitions and united bank 

In 2016, Financial group has completed the legal takeover of Khanty-Mansiysk Otkritie Bank by Otkritie FC Bank. As the financial group's press service reported, the merged bank would hold total assets of Rub 3.1 tln.

In December 2016 Otkritie Group and Rosgosstrakh Group (the Russia's largest insurance company) agreed to merge.

Outflow of liquidity 
Otkritie experienced a significant outflow of liquidity in July 2017, after it was assigned a BBB- rating by ACRA. According to the Financial Times, senior managers of Otkritie have removed their personal funds from the bank. By late August Oktrikie shares had fallen to a 20-month low.

On 29 August 2017 the Central Bank of Russia announced it would take over administration of Otkritie.

In August 2021, the Central Bank of Russia announced the launch of preparations for the sale of Otkritie FC Bank, as well as the dates for accepting applications from potential shareholders from 11 to 22 October of the same year. The regulator is studying options to sell Otkritie FC Bank shares through organized listing and alternate ways for selling its shares to a strategic investor.

Links to VTB Bank
The state-owned VTB Bank had a 10% stake in Otkritie's parent company, later written off after the 2017 bailout. In 2018, it was revealed that Otkritie had amassed an undisclosed 20% stake in VTB Bank, making it the bank's largest shareholder after the Russian government. Otkritie's rapid rise had been aided by cheap loans from VTB.

The purchase of VTB stock costed Otkritie tens of billions of rubles, but helped boost VTB's stock price, which had lagged behind its domestic competitors. The stake in VTB was spread between Otkritie's various subsidiaries, to avoid reaching the 5% threshold for mandatory holdings disclosure.

In December 2022, the Bank of Russia withdrew from the capital of Otkritie Bank, 100% of the shares were transferred to VTB.

Ownership
 Bank of Russia (99.00% as of December 2017)

Before the bailout, owners included the Czech PPF Group (29.9%) owned by Petr Kellner, the Slovak businessman Roman Korbačka (20%), and the Russian ICT Group (50.1%) of which Alexander Nesis is President.

Lawsuit
Although Boris Mints, co-founder of the bank, had sold his shares in the bank in 2013, he allegedly still had a relationship with Otkritie. In a lawsuit in the High court of the UK, the central bank alleged that Mints' company, O1, had sold bonds to the banks as a "fraudulent scheme" to pay off its debt just days before the collapse, according to a Financial Times report. An earlier report in February 2019 had stated that the banks were alleged to have sustained "losses from purchasing large amounts of O1 and Otkritie Holding assets".

In June 2018, Russia petitioned the UK court to freeze £470 million of Mints' assets, including a mansion in Perthshire, Scotland, known as the Tower of Lethendy. The court agreed only to an injunction prohibiting Minsk and his three sons from disposing of  assets, including  the mansion. The Tower of Lethendy is only one of 140 of Mints' properties that the banks were attempting to confiscate. Ownership documents indicate that the mansion is owned by MFT Braveheart Ltd, a company registered in the Cayman Islands. According to the FT report, "Mr Mints and his sons deny committing fraud and are contesting the allegations in arbitration proceedings scheduled to be heard next April in London".

Management Board
Mikhail Alekseyev has been the Board's Chairman since January 1, 2023.

Currency exchange 
In 2014, the bank offered a service called Client Bank, an online currency conversion service. Corporate customers can use Client Bank to exchange currency online.

On October 21, 2013, NOMOS-BANK has been admitted to trading on the Moscow Exchange.

References

External links

otkritiefc.com (web.archive.org)
otkritiefc.ru (web.archive.org)
Financial information

Banks of Russia
Companies based in Moscow
Banks established in 1993
Companies listed on the Moscow Exchange
Russian entities subject to the U.S. Department of the Treasury sanctions